Paratorna catenulella is a species of moth of the family Tortricidae. It is found in the Russian Far East, Japan (Honshu), the Korean Peninsula and China (Jilin, Heilongjiang, Jiangsu).

The wingspan is 14–19 mm.

References

Moths described in 1882
Tortricini
Moths of Asia